Clackmannanshire and Kinross-shire was a constituency of the House of Commons of the Parliament of the United Kingdom from 1832 to 1918.

From 1708 to 1832 Clackmannanshire and Kinross-shire had been paired as alternating constituencies: one of the constituencies elected a Member of Parliament (MP) to one parliament, the other to the next.

From 1832, the two were joined by the Representation of the People (Scotland) Act 1832 in a single constituency of Clackmannanshire and Kinross-shire. The constituency also included the parishes of Tulliallan, Culross and Muckhart in Perthshire, the Perthshire portions of the parishes of Logie and Fossaway, and the Stirlingshire part of the parish of Alva.

From 1918, Clackmannanshire was represented as part of Clackmannan and Eastern Stirlingshire, and Kinross-shire as part of Kinross and Western Perthshire.

Members of Parliament

Election results

Elections in the 1830s

Adam was appointed as a Lord Commissioner of the Admiralty, requiring a by-election.

Elections in the 1840s

Abercromby resigned by accepting the office of Steward of the Chiltern Hundreds, causing a by-election.

Elections in the 1850s
Morison's death caused a by-election.

Elections in the 1860s
Adam was appointed a Lord Commissioner of the Treasury, requiring a by-election.

Adam was appointed a Lord Commissioner of the Treasury, requiring a by-election.

Elections in the 1870s

Elections in the 1880s

Adam was appointed as First Commissioner of works and Public Buildings, requiring a by-election.

Adam was appointed as Governor of Madras, causing a by-election.

Balfour was appointed Lord Advocate, requiring a by-election.

Elections in the 1890s

Balfour accepted office as Lord Advocate, prompting a by-election.

Balfour is appointed Lord President of the Court of Session, prompting a by-election.

Elections in the 1900s

Elections in the 1910s

References

Historic parliamentary constituencies in Scotland (Westminster)
Constituencies of the Parliament of the United Kingdom established in 1832
Constituencies of the Parliament of the United Kingdom disestablished in 1918
Politics of Perth and Kinross
Kinross
Politics of Clackmannanshire